The Estadio Municipal Claudio Suárez is a multi-use stadium located in Texcoco, State of Mexico, Mexico.  It is currently used mostly for football matches and is the home stadium for Faraones de Texcoco.  The stadium has a capacity of 4,000 people.

References

External links

Multi-purpose stadiums in Mexico
Municipal Claudio Suarez
Athletics (track and field) venues in Mexico